The RAC 112 APILAS (Armor-Piercing Infantry Light Arm System) is a portable one-shot 112 mm recoilless anti-tank weapon, designed in France by GIAT Industries. Over 120,000 of the APILAS launchers have been produced, and they are in service with many countries.

Description 
The APILAS is supplied in an aramid fibre launcher tube with a retractable sight. The effective range of APILAS is from 25 m (it takes 25 m for the rocket to arm itself) up to 300-500 m depending on the target. The shaped charge warhead is electrically fused and will detonate at impact angles up to 80 degrees. 

Although heavy, the APILAS is able to pierce 700 mm of RHA. Within the French Army it is categorized as "traumatic weapon", because of its blast and noise. A French soldier cannot fire it more than three times in his service during peacetime.

An off-route mine system was developed using the APILAS rocket mounted on a tripod using a sensor package, or tripwires.

Production 
84,000 were ordered in 1984 by the French Army to replace the LRAC F1 until the adoption of the Eryx short-range missile. The French company Matra Manurhin Défense (now NEXTER - ex GIAT) produced 120,000 APILAS between 1985 and 2006.

Specifications
 Calibre: 112 mm
 Length
 Launcher:
Transportation: 1290 mm
Fire-ready: 1260 mm
 Projectile: 920 mm
 Weight:
 Overall: 9.0 kg
 Projectile: 4.3 kg
 Launcher: 4.7 kg
 Range: 25 m to 300 m + (moving target) 500 m + (static target)
 Engine: Solid-fuel rocket
 Muzzle velocity: 293 m/s
 Time of flight to 500 m: 1.9 s
 Warhead: 1.5 kg shaped charge capable of penetrating 720 mm RHAe or 2 m of concrete
 Trigger: Piezoelectric sensor with 50g black powder

Operators

 

 
 
 
 
 
 
 
 
 
 
 
 
 
 
 
  Free Syrian Army

See also
 LRAC F1
 Eryx
 LAW 80
 AT4
 C-100
 Kestrel

References

Sources
 Jane's Infantry Weapons 2005–2006
 Jane's Mines and Mine Clearance 2005–2006

Anti-tank rockets
Weapons of France
Nexter Systems
Military equipment introduced in the 1980s